ARA Granville (P-33) is a  of the Argentine Navy named after Guillermo Enrique Granville, who fought in the Battle of Juncal against Brazil.

 she was based at Mar del Plata, and had for many years been conducting fishery patrol duties in the Argentine exclusive economic zone where she has captured several trawlers.

According to reports in November 2012 the Drummond class "hardly sail because of lack of resources for operational expenses". As of 2020, only Granville was reported operational (having undergone a refit in mid-2019) with the other ships of the class in reserve.

Service history 
The sale was embargoed by United Nations Security Council Resolution 418 during sea trials and the ships were sold to Argentina instead. A third ship was ordered and entered service as ARA Granville on 22 June 1981, in time for the Falklands War the following year. There are minor differences in equipment fit compared to her sisters, for instance Granville has French Degaie decoys rather than the British Corvus chaff launchers.

On 28 March 1982 she sailed with her sister  and took up station northeast of Port Stanley to cover the main amphibious landings on 2 April. After the attack she operated north of the Falklands with her sister ships as Task Group 79.4, hoping to catch ships detached from the British task force. On 29 April the corvettes were trailed by the submarine  whilst she was looking for the Argentine aircraft carrier , but they managed to outrun the British submarine.

Granville carried the P-3 pennant number until the introduction of the s in 1985 when she became P-33. In 1994, Granville and her sisters participated in Operation Uphold Democracy, the United Nations blockade of Haiti. During this time, she was based at Roosevelt Roads Naval Station in Puerto Rico.

According to British reports, in 1995 Granville harassed a number of trawlers around the Falklands and confronted and illuminated the British forward repair ship  with her radar.

References

Further reading 
 Guia de los buques de la Armada Argentina 2005–2006. Ignacio Amendolara Bourdette, Editor n/a. (Spanish/English text)

External links 
 Argentine Navy official site, specifications and brief history (in Spanish)

Drummond-class corvettes
Ships built in France
1981 ships
Corvettes of Argentina
Corvettes of the Cold War